Ghost Punting, also known as Lucky Stars Ghost Encounter, is a 1992 Hong Kong action comedy film directed by and starring Sammo Hung. It is the sixth film of the Lucky Stars series. Co-starring Lucky Stars members Eric Tsang (also co-director), Stanley Fung, Richard Ng, Charlie Chin and non-Lucky Star member Natalis Chan with action choreography by the Sammo Hung Stuntmen's Association and Corey Yuen (also co-director). The film's emphasis is more on comedy than action.

Synopsis
The Lucky Stars go on an island vacation and discover a nympho ghost in a castle near their cabin. Four policewomen come to investigate and the boys try to put the moves on them. After many failed attempts, one of the policewomen, Lai Ti, is possessed by a male ghost that is residing in the castle. The gang take her back to Hong Kong where they learn that the ghost wants revenge for his death. The gang are more than willing to oblige if the ghost helps them cheat in gambling. This all leads to the inevitable showdown where Kidstuff uses his kung fu skills to fight the ghost's killers.

Cast

Box office
This film grossed HK $8,281,568 at the Hong Kong box office.

External links
 
 Ghost Punting at Hong Kong Cinemagic
 

1992 films
1992 action comedy films
1990s martial arts comedy films
Hong Kong action comedy films
1990s Cantonese-language films
Films directed by Sammo Hung
Films directed by Corey Yuen
Films directed by Eric Tsang
Hong Kong martial arts comedy films
1990s Hong Kong films